Chobari is a village near Bhachau, in Bhachau Taluka in Kutch district of Gujarat state.

Etymology 
There is a stepwell with four gates, literally Chobari or Chobari, which lend its name to village.

Places of interest 
It is one of the points from which in the dry season the Rann of Kutch is crossed. Here in 1783 the army of the Maharaja of Jodhpur was totally defeated by Fateh Ali Talpur of Sindh. The scene of the fight is marked by the tombstones of fifty-six Rajputs.

References 

Villages in Kutch district